Italy competed at the 2017 European Athletics Indoor Championships in Belgrade, Serbia, from 3 to 5 March 2017.

Medalists

Other finalists (7) 
4th: Women's  relay (Lucia Pasquale, Maria Enrica Spacca, Maria Benedicta Chigbolu, Ayomide Folorunso) 3:32.87
6th: Marouan Razine (3000m) 8:04.19 final, 7:55.17 heats
6th: Silvano Chesani (high jump) 2.27 final, 2.28 qual.
7th: Yeman Crippa (3000m) 8:05.63 final, 7:59.76 heats
7th: Filippo Randazzo (long jump) 7.77 final, 7.89 qual.
7th: Giulia Viola (3000m) 8:56.19 PB final, 8:57.86 batt.
8th: Yassin Bouih (1500m) 3:47.95 final, 3:44.67 batt.

Personal Bests
Simone Cairoli 5841 (eptathlon); 7.55 (long jump); 4.60 (pole vault)
Giulia Viola 8:56.19 (3000m)

Other Season Bests
Silvano Chesani 2.28 (high jump)
Fabrizio Donato 17.13 (triple jump)
Simone Cairoli 8.31 (60hs)
Gloria Hooper 7.34 (60m)

See also
 Italy national athletics team

References

External links
 EAA official site

2017
2017 European Athletics Indoor Championships
2017 in Italian sport